Armstrong Investment Managers LLP, a.k.a., AIM, is a global investment management firm that invests in public equity, fixed income, and alternative investment instruments globally.

The firm, headquartered in the UK, was founded by Patrick Armstrong and his, now ex-wife, Ana Cukic-Armstrong.  Cukic-Armstrong was head of portfolio construction at UBS Wealth Management and co-head of the multi-asset group at Insight Investment. Recently Cenk Aydin joined from JPMorgan as the Managing Director responsible for business development in the Middle Eastern and Turkish markets.

Awards and Nomination 
 HFM European Hedge Fund Performance Awards 2017 - Ucits other
 HFM European Hedge Fund Performance Awards 2017 - Multi Strategy
 CTA Intelligence European Performance Awards 2016 - Systematic Macro
 2016 City A.M. - Top 10 women in investments 
 2016 City A.M. - Power 100 Women 
 2016 I-Invest - Best Global Multi Asset Fund Manager
 2016 Wealth & Finance International - Best UK Multi Asset Fund - AIM Multi Asset, a vanity award
 2016 ACQ Awards - Gamechanger of the Year
 2016 ACQ Awards - Macro Fund Manager of the Year
 2016 ACQ Awards - Multi Asset Fund of the Year
 2016 AI Magazine - Most Innovative Hedge Fund Manager
 2016 AI Hedge Fund Awards - Top 5 Global Multi-Asset Fund - FP Distinction Diversified Real Return 
 2015 ACQ Awards - Gamechanger of the Year
 2015 ACQ Awards - Macro Fund Manager of the Year
 2015 ACQ Awards - Multi Asset Fund of the Year
Macro Fund Manager of the Year, 2014, ACQ5 Awards 
Global Macro Fund of the Year, 2013, International Hedge Fund Awards.

References

Investment promotion agencies